Missan may refer to:

Maysan Governorate, Iraq
Missan, Sindh, Pakistan
Missan Oil Company, a state-owned oil and gas company in the Maysan Governorate, Iraq